Susan Lord from the University of San Diego, California, USA was named Fellow of the Institute of Electrical and Electronics Engineers (IEEE) in 2015 for professional leadership and contributions to engineering education.

Awards
 2020: IEEE Undergraduate Teaching Award

References 

Fellow Members of the IEEE
Living people
Year of birth missing (living people)
University of San Diego faculty
Place of birth missing (living people)
American electrical engineers